The London, Midland and Scottish Railway (LMS) Rebuilt Royal Scot Class is a class of 4-6-0 steam locomotives.  70 members of this class were rebuilt by the LMS and its successor British Railways (BR) from LMS Royal Scot Class engines by the replacement of their life expired parallel boilers with a type 2A boiler over the period 1943–1955.  (The class sometimes is numbered 71 as it included a prototype 1935 rebuild LMS (4)6170 British Legion, but sufficient technical differences existed which dictate that it is treated separately).  They were the second type of LMS 2 and 2A boilered 4-6-0 locomotives, after the rebuild of British Legion and the LMS Rebuilt Jubilee Class.

LMS gave them the power classification 6P; this was later revised by BR to 7P.

Rebuilding

1948 Exchange trials

In the 1948 Locomotive Exchange Trials, carried out by the recently nationalised British Railways, involved 46154 The Hussar and 46162 Queens Westminster Rifleman.  Apparently a rebuilt 'Royal Scot' proved capable of matching the maximum performance of the much larger LMS Coronation Class.

Accidents

Six people died as a result of the crash.
On 21 April 1952, 46117 Welsh Guardsman was one of two hauling an express passenger train which derailed at Blea Moor Loops, West Riding of Yorkshire due to a defect on the other locomotive causing a set of points to move under the train.

Withdrawal
 

All were withdrawn between 1962 and 1965 in accordance with the 1955 Modernisation Plan.

Preservation 
Of the 70 engines to be rebuilt only 2 members of the class have survived into preservation.

References

Further reading 

 LMS Locomotive Profiles Vol. 1

Rebuilt Royal scot
Railway locomotives introduced in 1943
Rebuilt locomotives
Passenger locomotives